Ana María Lazo, commonly known as Mimí Lazo, (born November 23, 1954 in Caracas) is a Venezuelan film, socialist political activist, television and theatrical actress and producer. Her most notable role was in the 1996 monologue El Aplauso Va Por Dentro in which she toured all throughout South America and Europe.

Biography

Early life 
Mimí began her acting in the workshops of well known stage directors of Caracas in the mid-1970s. Later she received scholarships to study Scenic Arts in Italy and attended acting classes in the Actors Studio of New York.

Career 
She began her acting career in the Venezuelan theatre performing adaptations of plays by William Shakespeare, such as Twelfth Night, Arthur Miller's A View from the Bridge, among others.

In 1979 she made her debut in the Venezuelan cinema with the film El Pez que Fuma, produced by the long time filmmaker Roman Chalbaud, and her first appearance on national television with the popular telenovela Carolina. It wasn't until the year 2000 where she made her debut in the international cinema with the independent film Just for the Time Being alongside Eva Herzigová and Patrick O'Neil.

She has received numerous awards in film festival and theater awards both in her native country and abroad. In 1995 she was among the successful Latin American actresses by Variety magazine, and Style magazine considers her one of the best actresses in Latin America alongside Salma Hayek and María Conchita Alonso.

Personal life 
Mimí is currently married to Venezuelan actor Luis Fernández. Her daughter, Sindy Lazo, is also an actress.

Filmography

Films

Television

References

External links

Mimi Lazo Official Website
Mimi Lazo on Venevision

1958 births
Living people
Venezuelan stage actresses
Venezuelan people of Italian descent
Actresses from Caracas
Venezuelan film actresses
Venezuelan telenovela actresses